Reinhard Houben (born 29 April 1960) is a German politician of the Free Democratic Party (FDP) who has been serving as a member of the Bundestag from the state of North Rhine-Westphalia since 2017.

Early life and career 
Houben graduated in business administration in Siegen in 1983 with a degree in business administration. Since 1984 he has been managing partner of Arnold Houben GmbH, a medium-sized trading company in Cologne’s Rodenkirchen district.

Political career 
Houben has been a member of the FDP since 1983. On a local level, he served on the city council of Cologne from 1989 until 1994 and from 2009 until 2017. 

Houben became a member of the Bundestag in the 2017 German federal election. Since January 2018, he has been a member of the Committee for Economic Affairs and Energy, where he is his parliamentary group’s spokesperson on economic policy.

In the negotiations to form a so-called traffic light coalition of the Social Democratic Party (SPD), the Green Party and the FDP following the 2021 German elections, Houben was part of his party's delegation in the working group on economic affairs, co-chaired by Carsten Schneider, Cem Özdemir and Michael Theurer.

Other activities 
 Federal Network Agency for Electricity, Gas, Telecommunications, Post and Railway (BNetzA), Member of the Advisory Board
 Koelnmesse, Member of the Supervisory Board (2014-2018)

References

External links 

  
 Bundestag biography 
 

1960 births
Living people
Members of the Bundestag for North Rhine-Westphalia
Members of the Bundestag 2021–2025
Members of the Bundestag 2017–2021
Members of the Bundestag for the Free Democratic Party (Germany)